Ruy or Ruj, is a mountain on the border of western Bulgaria and southeastern Serbia. Its eponymous highest peak rises 1,706 meters above sea level. The mountain is located west of Tran and is part of the Ruy-Verila range. On a clear day one can see Rila and Vitosha in Bulgaria and Veliki Strešer in Serbia.

References

Mountains of Bulgaria
Mountains of Serbia
Landforms of Pernik Province
Bulgaria–Serbia border
International mountains of Europe
Rhodope mountain range